Walid Cherif (born March 9, 1978) is a boxer from Tunisia, who won the gold medal in 2003 at the All-Africa Games in Abuja, Nigeria.

He also participated in the 2004 Summer Olympics for his native North African country. There he was beaten in the first round of the Flyweight (51 kg) division by Georgia's Nikoloz Izoria.

Cherif also competed at the 2008 Summer Olympics. He beat Australian Stephen Sutherland and upset 2005 world champ Lee Ok-Sung before losing 5:7 to Vincenzo Picardi in the quarterfinal. He was a member of the team that competed for Africa at the 2005 Boxing World Cup in Moscow, Russia.

References
sports-reference

1978 births
Living people
Flyweight boxers
Boxers at the 2004 Summer Olympics
Boxers at the 2008 Summer Olympics
Olympic boxers of Tunisia
Tunisian male boxers

Mediterranean Games silver medalists for Tunisia
Mediterranean Games bronze medalists for Tunisia
Competitors at the 2001 Mediterranean Games
Competitors at the 2005 Mediterranean Games
African Games gold medalists for Tunisia
African Games medalists in boxing
Mediterranean Games medalists in boxing
Competitors at the 2003 All-Africa Games
20th-century Tunisian people
21st-century Tunisian people